River Allen may refer to:

Watercourses
River Allen, Dorset, England
River Allen, Northumberland, England
River Allen, Cornwall, England, a tributary of the River Camel
River Allen (Truro), England, a tributary of the Truro River

People
River Allen (footballer) (born 1996), English footballer

See also 

 Allen River, New Zealand